Dakota is a historic home located near Warrenton, Fauquier County, Virginia.  The house was designed by architect William Lawrence Bottomley and built in 1928.  It is a two-story, Colonial Revival style dwelling.  It has brick facing over a masonry block core; a slate-shingled hipped roof; and a symmetrical five-bay facade with a centered entry with a classical surround.  A one-story bedroom wing was added to the right of the house in 1948 and garage addition was added to the left of the house in 1948.  Also on the property are the contributing original garage and a stable building. Dakota is located near the site of the former Horse Show Grounds outside of Warrenton.

It was listed on the National Register of Historic Places in 2005.

References

Houses on the National Register of Historic Places in Virginia
Colonial Revival architecture in Virginia
Houses completed in 1928
Houses in Fauquier County, Virginia
National Register of Historic Places in Fauquier County, Virginia
1928 establishments in Virginia